Steve Whittaker is a Professor in Human-Computer Interaction at the University of California Santa Cruz. He is best known for his research at the intersection of computer science and social science in particular on computer mediated communication and personal information management. He is a Fellow of the ACM, and winner of the CSCW 2018 "Lasting Impact" award. He also received a Lifetime Research Achievement Award from SIGCHI, is a Member of the SIGCHI Academy. He is Editor of the journal Human Computer Interaction..

Life

He was born in Liverpool in the UK, in 1957. As an undergraduate he studied Natural Sciences at Cambridge, obtaining his PhD in Cognitive Psychology at St. Andrews. He  spent many years in industry where he worked at Hewlett-Packard Labs, AT&T Labs, and IBM Research Labs. Moving to academia he was Professor of Information Science at University of Sheffield, before relocating to the University of California in 2009.

Research 
He publishes in the fields of Human Computer Interaction and Computer Supported Co-operative Work. His applies social science theory to understand people's interactions with technologies, using these insights to design new human-centric technologies. His early research focused on computer mediated communication, extending psychological theories of conversation to develop new accounts of online interaction. That work led to the design of novel collaboration, messaging and social computing technologies some which have now become standard. He has also researched Personal information management. He co-published a book with Ofer Bergman: The Science of Managing Our Digital Stuff which uses cognitive psychology to understand how we organize and access our personal digital information. He was also one of the first to document how email contributes to information overload, proposing technical approaches to address this. More recently his work examined 'digital memory', critiquing Lifelogging approaches and developing new techniques for understanding and reflecting on our pasts.

Awards 
ACM Fellow (2015).

ACM SIGCHI Lifetime Research Award (2014).

ACM SIGCHI Academy (2008).

ACM CSCW Lasting Impact Award (2018).

Editor, Human Computer Interaction (2013–present)

Selected bibliography 

 Whittaker, S. and Sidner, C. (1996). Email overload: exploring personal information management of email. In Proceedings of CHI'96 Conference on Computer Human Interaction, 276–283, NY: ACM Press. https://dl.acm.org/doi/10.1145/238386.238530
 Whittaker, S., and O'Conaill, B. (1997). The role of vision in face-to-face and mediated communication. In In K. Finn, A. Sellen, S. Wilbur (Eds.), Video mediated communication. LEA: NJ. https://psycnet.apa.org/record/1997-08440-001
 Whittaker, S. Terveen, L., Hill, W., and Cherny, L. (1998). The dynamics of mass interaction, In Proceedings of Conference on Computer Supported Cooperative Work, 257–264. NY: ACM Press. https://dl.acm.org/doi/10.1145/289444.289500
 Nardi, B., Whittaker, S., Bradner, E. (2000). Interaction and Outeraction: Instant Messaging in Action. In Proceedings of Conference on Computer Supported Cooperative Work, 79–88. New York: ACM Press. https://dl.acm.org/doi/10.1145/358916.358975
 Whittaker, S., Terveen, L., and Nardi, B. (2000). Let's stop pushing the envelope and start addressing it: a reference task agenda for HCI. Human Computer Interaction, 15, 75-106. https://dl.acm.org/doi/10.1207/S15327051HCI1523_2
 Whittaker, S. (2002). Theories and Methods in Mediated Communication. In Graesser, A., Gernsbacher, M., and Goldman, S. (Ed.) The Handbook of Discourse Processes, 243–286, Erlbaum, NJ. https://psycnet.apa.org/record/2003-02476-006
 Sellen, A., and Whittaker, S. (2010). Lifelogging: What Are We Doing and Why Are We Doing It? Communications of the ACM, Vol. 53, No. 5, 70–77. https://cacm.acm.org/magazines/2010/5/87249-beyond-total-capture/fulltext
 Whittaker. S. (2011). Personal Information Management: From Consumption to Curation In B. Cronin (Ed.) Annual Review of Information Science and Technology, 45, 1-42, Wiley, Medford, NJ. DOI: 10.1002/aris.2011.1440450108. https://doi.org/10.1002/aris.2011.1440450108
 Whittaker, S., Matthews, T., Cerruti, J., Badenes, H., and Tang, J. (2011). Am I wasting my time organizing email?: a study of email refinding. In Proceedings of the 2011 Conference on Human factors in computing systems (CHI '11). ACM, New York, NY, USA, 3449–3458. https://dl.acm.org/doi/10.1145/1978942.1979457
 Bergman, O. and Whittaker, S (2016). The Science of Managing Our Digital Stuff, Cambridge, MIT Press. https://mitpress.mit.edu/books/science-managing-our-digital-stuff

References

External links
Human Computer Interaction Journal
Whittaker's personal homepage

Human–computer interaction researchers
Alumni of the University of Cambridge
Alumni of the University of St Andrews
Academics of the University of Sheffield
Living people
Year of birth missing (living people)